Kuthiran Tunnel (Malayalam: കുതിരാന്‍ തുരങ്കം) is a twin-tube six-lane highway tunnel in the South Indian state of Kerala. The tunnel is located on the National Highway 544 and it is owned and operated by the National Highways Authority of India. This is Kerala's first-ever tunnel for road transport and South India's longest six-lane road tunnel. Construction of the tunnel started in 2016 and completed by December 2021.

Nitin Gadkari, the Minister of Road Transport and Highways announced the opening of one of the twin tube tunnels through the social platform Twitter. The second tunnel opened in January 2022.

Present traffic
Kuthiran gradient is situated in the Kuthiran Hills, situated in the western part of Anaimalai Hills. The hills are part of Peechi-Vazhani Wildlife Sanctuary.

Kuthiran gradient was a major traffic bottleneck and an accident spot on the crowded Thrissur-Palakkad stretch of the 6 lane National Highway 544 (India) used by long distance traffic coming from Coimbatore, Salem, Chennai and Bengaluru. It was the missing link that was planned to be constructed when the Highway was designed.

The works on tunnel took more than a decade to complete due to geological and administrative challenges. The project was awarded in 2009 but the work on the tunnel only began in 2016.

On completion of works, both the tunnels reduced the distance between Kochi to Coimbatore by  but travel time got reduced by hours since there used to be traffic jams caused by heavy vehicles trying to traverse through the hills.

In August 2018 during 2018 Kerala floods, the tunnel was opened for passage of emergency vehicles. In June 2019 the tunnel was opened for four hours following a Gridlock caused due to an accident at Kuthiran Bridge. In October 2020, a Gridlock happened after an accident causing long queues extending to kilometers on both sides, and traffic resumed only in the evening after temporarily opening the under construction tunnel.

On 31st December 2020, seven vehicles  collided in an accident and 3 people died at Kuthiran causing a gridlock. These type of gridlocks used to happen regularly at this spot due to frequent accidents, and people who are aware of this used to prefer alternative longer routes just for the sake of a reliable journey time. An RTI query in 2019 revealed 235 people have died in this stretch due to accidents in the past 10 years.

In January 2020, the tunnel was partially opened to facilitate Power Grid Corporation of India's underground cabling works between Thrissur and Palakkad.

On July 31, 2021, one of the two tunnels in Palakkad - Thrissur direction was officially opened for traffic following an announcement made by Nitin Gadkari through Twitter.

Cost
The Pragati group was subcontracted the work by the Hyderabad-based KMC company. Pragathi bagged the sub-contract at a cost of Rs 200 crore.

Dimension
The 6 lane twin tube tunnels will have length of almost 1 kilometer, left tube  and right tube , while the width and height would be , respectively. There are two emergency crossovers inside the tunnel.

Gallery

References

Road tunnels in Kerala
Transport in Thrissur district
Proposed road infrastructure in India
History of Kerala (1947–present)